Events from the year 1941 in Romania.

Incumbents
King: Michael
Prime Minister: Ion Antonescu

Events
January 21–23 – Legionnaires' rebellion and Bucharest pogrom results in the disestablishment of the National Legionary State
March 5 – March 1941 Romanian policy referendum
April 1 – Fântâna Albă massacre
June 26 – Raid on Constanța
June 27 – Iași pogrom
July 2–24 – Operation München
August 8–October 16 – Siege of Odessa
November 9 – November 1941 Romanian policy referendum

Births
February 1 – Teofil Codreanu, footballer (died 2016)
February 3 – Ștefan Iordache, actor (died 2008)
February 4 – Șerban Cantacuzino, actor (died 2011)
February 13 – Paul Dan Cristea, professor of engineering  (died 2013) 
March 10 – Teodor Meleșcanu, politician and diplomat
April 29 – Mircea Veroiu, film director and screenwriter (died 1997)
June 3 – Constantin Bușoiu, wrestler
June 14 – Viorel P. Barbu, mathematician
June 19 – Irina Petrescu, actress (died 2013)
July 14 – George Anania, science fiction writer, playwright, and translator (died 2013)
July 30 – Gheorghe Condovici, gymnast
September 8 – Dan Coe, footballer (died 1981)
September 20 – Constantin Ciucă, boxer
November 15 – Corneliu Ciontu, politician 
November 24 – Emil Hossu, actor (died 2012)
December 25 – Ioan Alexandru, poet, essayist, and politician (died 2000)

Deaths
February 4 – David Emmanuel, mathematician (born 1854)
March 17 – Nicolae Titulescu, diplomat and politician (born 1882)
April 7 – Lazăr Edeleanu, chemist (born 1861)
April 8 – Nushi Tulliu, poet and prose writer (born 1872)
June 5 – Alexandru Nicolescu, bishop (born 1882)
June 19 – Elena Popea, painter (born 1879)
June 24 – Maria Baiulescu, author, suffragist, women’s rights activist (born 1860)
June 26 – Nicolae Minovici, forensic scientist (born 1868)
July 2 – George Valentin Bibescu, early aviation pioneer (born 1880)
July 8 – Alexandru Bassarab, painter (born 1907)
July 19 – Filimon Sârbu, communist activist (born 1916; executed)
August 6 – Izabela Sadoveanu-Evan, literary critic, educationist, journalist, poet and feminist militant (born 1870)
August 6 – Alexandru Baltagă, Bessarabian priest (born 1861; died in Soviet custody)
September 17 – Alexandru Ioanițiu, general (born 1890; killed in accident near Odessa)
September 20 – Petre Sucitulescu, footballer and soldier (killed in action at Dalnik)
October 22 – Ioan Glogojeanu, general (born 1888; killed in explosion at Odessa)
November 7 – Francisc Panet, chemical engineer and communist activist (born 1907; executed)
December 6 – Teodor Neaga, Bessarabian politician (born 1878)

References

Bibliography
 

Years of the 20th century in Romania
1940s in Romania
 
Romania
Romania